East Branch Pleasant River may refer to:

East Branch Pleasant River (Pleasant River tributary), tributary of the Pleasant River in the U.S. state of Maine
East Branch Pleasant River (Piscataquis River tributary), tributary of the Piscataquis River in Piscataquis County, Maine

See also 
West Branch Pleasant River (disambiguation)
Pleasant River (disambiguation)